Rudolf Brosch was an Austrian fencer. He competed in the individual foil event at the 1900 Summer Olympics. He also worked as a translator of the fencing books of Luigi Barbasetti, who was his fencing teacher, and wrote books about fencing himself.

References

External links
 

Year of birth missing
Year of death missing
Austrian male fencers
Austrian foil fencers
Olympic fencers of Austria
Fencers at the 1900 Summer Olympics
Place of birth missing
Place of death missing